Kelch-like protein 1 is a protein that in humans is encoded by the KLHL1 gene.

References

Further reading

Kelch proteins